Rose Hobart (born Rose Kefer; May 1, 1906 – August 29, 2000) was an American actress and a Screen Actors Guild official.

Early years
Born in New York City, Hobart was the daughter of a cellist in the New York Symphony Orchestra, Paul Kefer, and an opera singer, Marguerite Kefer. Her parents' divorce when she was seven resulted in Hobart and her sister, Polly, going to France to live with their grandmother. When World War I began, they came back to the United States and went to boarding schools. By 1921, she was a student at Kingston High School in Kingston, New York.

Career 
When Hobart was 15, she debuted professionally in Cappy Ricks, a Chautauqua production. She was accepted for the 18-week tour because she told officials that she was 18. At that same age, she was cast in Ferenc Molnár's Liliom, which opened in Atlantic City, New Jersey. Hobart's Broadway stage debut was on September 17, 1923 at the Knickerbocker Theater, playing a young girl in Lullaby. In 1925, she played Charmian in Caesar and Cleopatra.

Hobart was an original member of Eva Le Gallienne's Civic Repertory Theatre. In 1928, she made her London debut, playing Nina Rolf in The Comic Artist. During her career in theater, she toured with Noël Coward in The Vortex and was cast opposite Helen Hayes in What Every Woman Knows.

Her performance as Grazia in Death Takes a Holiday won her a Hollywood contract. Hobart appeared in more than 40 motion pictures over a 20-year period. Her first film role was the part of Julie in the first talking picture version of Liliom, made by Fox Film Corporation in 1930, starring Charles Farrell in the title role, and directed by Frank Borzage. Under contract to Universal, Hobart starred in A Lady Surrenders (1930), East of Borneo (1931), and Scandal for Sale (1932). On loan to other studios, she appeared in Chances (1931) and Compromised (1931). In 1931, she co-starred with Fredric March and Miriam Hopkins in Rouben Mamoulian's original film version of Dr. Jekyll and Mr. Hyde (1931). She played the role of Muriel, Jekyll's fiancée. In 1936, Surrealist artist Joseph Cornell, who bought a print of East of Borneo to screen at home, became smitten with the actress, and cut out nearly all the parts that did not include her. He also showed the film at silent film speed and projected it through a blue-tinted lens. He named the resulting work Rose Hobart. Hobart often played the "other woman" in movies during the 1940s, with her last major film role in Bride of Vengeance (1949).

Politics
The House Un-American Activities Committee investigated Hobart in 1949, effectively ending her career. She believed that she first came to the attention of anti-Communist activists because of her commitment to improving working conditions for actors in Hollywood. In 1986, she recalled that "On my first three pictures, they worked me 18 hours a day and then complained because I was losing so much weight that they had to put stuff in my evening dress . . . .  When I did East of Borneo (1931), that schlocky horror [film that] I did, we shot all night long. They started at 6 o'clock at night and finished at 5 in the morning. For two solid weeks, I was working with alligators, jaguars and pythons out on the back lot. I thought, 'This is acting?' It was ridiculous. We were militant about the working conditions. We wanted an eight-hour day like everybody else."

Hobart also served on the board of the Screen Actors Guild and was an active participant in the Actors' Laboratory Theatre, a group which anti-Communists like Senator Joseph McCarthy claimed was subversive. In 1948, Hobart was subpoenaed to appear before the Tenney Committee on Un-American Activities. Although Hobart was not a member of the Communist Party, she refused to cooperate, instead reading a prepared statement that concluded, "In a democracy no one should be forced or intimidated into a declaration of his principles. If one does yield to such pressure, he gives away his birthright. I am just mulish enough not to budge when anyone uses force on me." In 1950, Hobart was also listed in the anti-Communist blacklisting publication, Red Channels. Hobart never worked in film again, although she did work on stage, and, later as the blacklist eased, in the 1960s, she took on television roles, including a part on Peyton Place.

Personal life
Hobart was married three times. Her first marriage, to Benjamin L. Winter, ended in divorce in 1929. On October 9, 1932, she married William Mason Grosvenor, Jr., an executive in a chemical engineering firm. They were divorced on February 17, 1941. She had one child, son Judson Bosworth, from her third marriage to architect Barton H. Bosworth.

Later years
In 1994, Hobart published her autobiography, A Steady Digression to a Fixed Point.

Death
On August 29, 2000, Hobart died at the Motion Picture and Television Country House and Hospital in Woodland Hills, California, aged 94, from natural causes. She was survived by her only child, son Judson Bosworth (b. 1949).

Filmography

Film

Television

References

External links

1906 births
2000 deaths
20th-century American actresses
American film actresses
American stage actresses
American television actresses
Actresses from New York City
Hollywood blacklist